Laoling, often mispronounced as Leling, is a county-level city in the northwest of Shandong province, China, bordering Hebei province to the north. Laoling has more than 640,000 inhabitants (1999) and is under the jurisdiction of Dezhou City.

Administrative divisions
As 2012, this City is divided to 4 subdistricts, 8 towns and 4 townships.
Subdistricts

Towns

Townships

Climate

Food 

Laoling is famous for Chinese date. Also Boiled Fried Chicken(HuangMianJi, 黄面鸡) is the local cuisine that often offers during the Spring Festival.

References

External links 
 Laoling official website

 
Cities in Shandong
County-level divisions of Shandong
Dezhou